Failure mode effects and criticality analysis (FMECA) is an extension of failure mode and effects analysis (FMEA).

FMEA is a bottom-up, inductive analytical method which may be performed at either the functional or piece-part level. FMECA extends FMEA by including a criticality analysis, which is used to chart the probability of failure modes against the severity of their consequences. The result highlights failure modes with relatively high probability and severity of consequences, allowing remedial effort to be directed where it will produce the greatest value. FMECA tends to be preferred over FMEA in space and North Atlantic Treaty Organization (NATO) military applications, while various forms of FMEA predominate in other industries.

History
FMECA was originally developed in the 1940s by the U.S military, which published MIL–P–1629 in 1949. By the early 1960s, contractors for the U.S. National Aeronautics and Space Administration (NASA) were using variations of FMECA under a variety of names. In 1966 NASA released its FMECA procedure for use on the Apollo program. FMECA was subsequently used on other NASA programs including Viking, Voyager, Magellan, and Galileo.
Possibly because MIL–P–1629 was replaced by MIL–STD–1629 (SHIPS) in 1974, development of FMECA is sometimes incorrectly attributed to NASA.
At the same time as the space program developments, use of FMEA and FMECA was already 
spreading to civil aviation. In 1967 the Society for Automotive 
Engineers released the first civil publication to address FMECA. The civil aviation industry now tends to use a combination of FMEA and Fault Tree Analysis in accordance with SAE ARP4761 instead of FMECA, though some helicopter manufacturers continue to use FMECA for civil rotorcraft.

Ford Motor Company began using FMEA in the 1970s after problems experienced with its Pinto 
model, and by the 1980s FMEA was gaining broad use in the automotive industry. In Europe, 
the International Electrotechnical Commission published IEC 812 (now IEC 60812) in 1985, addressing both FMEA and FMECA for general use. The British Standards Institute published BS 5760–5 in 1991 for the same purpose.

In 1980, MIL–STD–1629A replaced both MIL–STD–1629 and the 1977 aeronautical FMECA standard MIL–STD–2070. MIL–STD–1629A was canceled without replacement in 1998, but nonetheless remains in wide use for military and space applications today.

Methodology
Slight differences are found between the various FMECA standards. By RAC CRTA–FMECA, the FMECA analysis procedure typically consists of the following logical steps:
 Define the system
 Define ground rules and assumptions in order to help drive the design
 Construct system block diagrams
 Identify failure modes (piece-part level or functional)
 Analyze failure effects/causes
 Feed results back into design process
 Classify the failure effects by severity
 Perform criticality calculations
 Rank failure mode criticality
 Determine critical items
 Feed results back into design process
 Identify the means of failure detection, isolation and compensation
 Perform maintainability analysis
 Document the analysis, summarize uncorrectable design areas, identify special controls necessary to reduce failure risk
 Make recommendations
 Follow up on corrective action implementation/effectiveness

FMECA may be performed at the functional or piece-part level. Functional FMECA considers the effects of failure at the functional block level, such as a power supply or an amplifier. 
Piece-part FMECA considers the effects of individual component failures, such as resistors, 
transistors, microcircuits, or valves. A piece-part FMECA requires far more effort, but provides the benefit of better estimates of probabilities of occurrence. However, Functional FMEAs can be performed much earlier, may help to better structure the complete risk assessment and provide other type of insight in mitigation options. The analyses are complementary.

The criticality analysis may be quantitative or qualitative, depending on the availability of supporting part failure data.

System definition
In this step, the major system to be analyzed is defined and partitioned into an indented 
hierarchy such as systems, subsystems or equipment, units or subassemblies, and piece-parts. Functional descriptions are created for the systems and allocated to the subsystems, 
covering all operational modes and mission phases.

Ground rules and assumptions
Before detailed analysis takes place, ground rules and assumptions are usually defined and agreed to. This might include, for example:
 Standardized mission profile with specific fixed duration mission phases
 Sources for failure rate and failure mode data
 Fault detection coverage that system built-in test will realize
 Whether the analysis will be functional or piece-part
 Criteria to be considered (mission abort, safety, maintenance, etc.)
 System for uniquely identifying parts or functions
 Severity category definitions

Block diagrams
Next, the systems and subsystems are depicted in functional block diagrams. Reliability 
block diagrams or fault trees are usually constructed at the same time. These diagrams are 
used to trace information flow at different levels of system hierarchy, identify critical 
paths and interfaces, and identify the higher level effects of lower level failures.

Failure mode identification
For each piece-part or each function covered by the analysis, a complete list of failure 
modes is developed. For functional FMECA, typical failure modes include:
 Untimely operation
 Failure to operate when required
 Loss of output
 Intermittent output
 Erroneous output (given the current condition)
 Invalid output (for any condition)

For piece-part FMECA, failure mode data may be obtained from databases such as RAC 
FMD–91 or RAC FMD–97. These databases provide not only the failure modes, but also the failure mode 
ratios. For example: 

Each function or piece-part is then listed in matrix form with one row for each failure 
mode. Because FMECA usually involves very large data sets, a unique identifier must be assigned to each item (function or piece-part), and to each failure mode of each item.

Failure effects analysis
Failure effects are determined and entered for each row of the FMECA matrix, considering the 
criteria identified in the ground rules. Effects are separately described for the local, next higher, and end (system) levels. System level effects may include:
 System failure
 Degraded operation
 System status failure
 No immediate effect
The failure effect categories used at various hierarchical levels are tailored by the 
analyst using engineering judgment.

Severity classification
Severity classification is assigned for each failure mode of each unique item and entered on the FMECA matrix, based upon system level consequences. A small set of classifications, 
usually having 3 to 10 severity levels, is used. For example, When prepared using MIL–STD–1629A, failure or mishap severity classification normally follows MIL–STD–882.

Current FMECA severity categories for U.S. Federal Aviation Administration (FAA), NASA and European Space Agency space applications are derived from MIL–STD–882.

Failure detection methods
For each component and failure mode, the ability of the system to detect and report the 
failure in question is analyzed. One of the following will be entered on each row of the FMECA matrix:
 Normal: the system correctly indicates a safe condition to the crew
 Abnormal: the system correctly indicates a malfunction requiring crew action
 Incorrect: the system erroneously indicates a safe condition in the event of malfunction, or alerts the crew to a malfunction that does not exist (false alarm)

Criticality ranking
Failure mode criticality assessment may be qualitative or quantitative. For qualitative 
assessment, a mishap probability code or number is assigned and entered on the matrix. For 
example, MIL–STD–882 uses five probability levels:

The failure mode may then be charted on a criticality matrix using severity code as one axis 
and probability level code as the other.
For quantitative assessment, modal criticality number  is calculated for each failure mode of each item, and item criticality number  is 
calculated for each item. The criticality numbers are computed using the following values:
 Basic failure rate 
 Failure mode ratio 
 Conditional probability 
 Mission phase duration 
The basic failure rate  is usually fed into the FMECA from a failure rate prediction based on MIL–HDBK–217, PRISM, RIAC 217Plus, or a similar 
model.
The failure mode ratio may be taken from a database source such as RAC FMD–97. For functional level FMECA, engineering judgment may be required to assign failure mode ratio.
The conditional probability number  represents the conditional
probability that the failure effect will result in the identified severity classification,
given that the failure mode occurs. It represents the analyst's best judgment as to the 
likelihood that the loss will occur.

Critical item/failure mode list
Once the criticality assessment is completed for each failure mode of each item, the FMECA matrix may be sorted by severity and qualitative probability level or quantitative 
criticality number. This enables the analysis to identify critical items and critical 
failure modes for which design mitigation is desired.

Recommendations
After performing FMECA, recommendations are made to design to reduce the consequences of critical failures. This may include selecting components with higher reliability, reducing 
the stress level at which a critical item operates, or adding redundancy or monitoring to the system.

Maintainability analysis
FMECA usually feeds into both Maintainability Analysis and Logistics Support Analysis, which both require data from the FMECA. FMECA is the most popular tool for failure and criticality analysis of systems for performance enhancement. In the present era of Industry 4.0, the industries are implementing a predictive maintenance strategy for their mechanical systems. The FMECA is widely used for the failure mode identification and prioritization of mechanical systems and their subsystems for predictive maintenance.

FMECA report
A FMECA report consists of system description, ground rules and assumptions, conclusions and 
recommendations, corrective actions to be tracked, and the attached FMECA matrix which may 
be in spreadsheet, worksheet, or database form.

Risk priority calculation
RAC CRTA–FMECA and MIL–HDBK–338 both identify Risk Priority Number (RPN) 
calculation as an alternate method to criticality analysis. The RPN is a result 
of a multiplication of detectability (D) x severity (S) x 
occurrence (O). With each on a scale from 1 to 10, the highest RPN is 
10x10x10 = 1000. This means that this 
failure is not detectable by inspection, very severe and the occurrence is almost sure. If 
the occurrence is very sparse, this would be 1 and the RPN would 
decrease to 100. So, criticality analysis enables to focus on the highest risks.

Advantages and disadvantages
Strengths of FMECA include its comprehensiveness, the systematic establishment of relationships between failure causes and effects, and its ability to point out individual failure modes for corrective action in design.

Weaknesses include the extensive labor required, the large number of trivial cases considered, and inability to deal with multiple-failure scenarios or unplanned cross-system effects such as sneak circuits.

According to an FAA research report for commercial space transportation, 
Failure Modes, effects, and Criticality Analysis is an excellent hazard analysis and risk assessment tool, but it suffers from other limitations. This alternative does not consider combined failures or typically include software and human interaction considerations. It also usually provides an optimistic estimate of reliability. Therefore, FMECA should be used in conjunction with other analytical tools when developing reliability estimates.

See also 
 Failure mode and effects analysis
 Integrated logistics support
 Reliability engineering
 RAMS
 Risk assessment
 Safety engineering
 System safety

References

Impact assessment
Maintenance
Reliability engineering
Safety engineering